Alejandro Tabilo was the defending champion but chose not to defend his title.

Daniel Altmaier won the title after defeating Federico Coria 6–2, 6–4 in the final.

Seeds

Draw

Finals

Top half

Bottom half

References

External links
Main draw
Qualifying draw

Challenger Ciudad de Guayaquil - 1
2022 Singles